Ectoedemia hexapetalae is a moth of the family Nepticulidae. It is found in France, Austria and Hungary.

The wingspan is 3.7-4.7 mm. Adults are on wing in May. There are probably two generations per year.

The larvae feed on Filipendula vulgaris. They mine the leaves of their host plant. The mine consists of  a narrow corridor, often following the leaf margin. The first part is entirely filled with brown, dispersed frass. Later, the frass is black, dispersed, but leaving clear margins.

External links
Fauna Europaea
bladmineerders.nl
A Taxonomic Revision Of The Western Palaearctic Species Of The Subgenera Zimmermannia Hering And Ectoedemia Busck s.str. (Lepidoptera, Nepticulidae), With Notes On Their Phylogeny

Nepticulidae
Moths of Europe
Moths described in 1957